Shaquil Akeem "Shaq" Barrett (born November 17, 1992) is an American football outside linebacker for the Tampa Bay Buccaneers of the National Football League (NFL). He played college football at the University of Nebraska-Omaha before transferring to Colorado State University, and was signed by the Denver Broncos as an undrafted free agent in 2014. After five seasons with the Broncos, including winning Super Bowl 50, Barrett signed with the Buccaneers. His level of play increased, making the Pro Bowl and All-Pro teams in 2019 after leading the league in sacks, and in 2021 won Super Bowl LV.

College career
Barrett started playing college football at Nebraska-Omaha in 2010. After the school eliminated its football program after the 2010 season, he transferred to Colorado State. Since Barrett was transferring from a school that cut its program, he was eligible to play immediately instead of having to sit out a year. Barrett played three seasons (2011–13) for Colorado State University. He started 35-of-38 games for CSU and totaled 246 tackles (116 solos), 18 sacks, 32.5 tackles for a loss, three interceptions, six passes defended, seven forced fumbles, four fumble recoveries, and three blocked kicks. Barrett was named Mountain West Conference Defensive Player of the Year as a senior in 2013 after ranking fifth in the nation with 12 sacks and 20.5 tackles for a loss.

Professional career

Denver Broncos

2014 season
Barrett went undrafted in the 2014 NFL Draft and received interest from the Denver Broncos and Pittsburgh Steelers as an undrafted free agent. On May 10, 2014, the Denver Broncos signed Barrett to a three-year, $1.53 million contract that included a signing bonus of $3,500. Barrett stated that his decision to choose to sign with the Denver Broncos was due to their willingness to look past draft rankings.

Throughout training camp, Barrett competed for a roster spot as a backup linebacker against Steven Johnson, L. J. Fort, Jamar Chaney, Jerrell Harris, and Corey Nelson. On August 30, 2014, the Denver Broncos waived Barrett as part of their final roster cuts. He was subsequently signed to their practice squad after clearing waivers the following day.

On October 14, 2014, the Broncos promoted Barrett to their active roster after an injury to starting linebacker Danny Trevathan. Barrett was signed to the 53-man roster for the Week 7 game against the San Francisco 49ers. He was once again signed to the 53-man roster for the AFC Divisional Playoff Game against the Indianapolis Colts, but did not play. Barrett did not appear in any games as a rookie in 2014.

2015 season
Barrett switched to jersey No. 56, but subsequently sold it to rookie linebacker and 2015 first round Shane Ray for $2,000 a few weeks later. He reverted back to his rookie No. 48. After finishing the 2015 NFL preseason with the most sacks of any player on the team, Barrett made the final 53-man roster. Head coach Gary Kubiak named Barrett the third string strongside linebacker to begin the regular season, behind Von Miller and Lerentee McCray.

Barrett made his NFL debut in the season-opener against the Baltimore Ravens. He recorded a tackle and a special teams stop in the 19-13 victory. During a Week 6 26-23 overtime road victory over the Cleveland Browns, Barrett made his first NFL start after DeMarcus Ware suffered a back injury. He finished the game with nine tackles (six solo), 1.5 sacks, three tackles for loss, a pass defensed, a forced fumble, and a fumble recovery.

Barrett finished his second professional season with 50 tackles, 5.5 sacks, four passes defensed, four forced fumbles, two fumble recoveries, and nine special-teams tackles in 16 games and six starts. The Broncos finished atop the AFC West with a 12-4 record and earned a first-round bye in the playoffs. Barrett tallied two tackles and one special-teams stop in Denver's three postseason games. On February 7, 2016, Barrett played in Super Bowl 50, but left the game to be evaluated with a concussion. He returned to finish the game and the Broncos defeated the Carolina Panthers by a score of 24–10.

2016 season
In 2016, Barrett played all 16 games and totaled 36 tackles (20 solo), 1.5 sacks, a forced fumble, and two passes defensed.

2017 season
In 2017, Barrett appeared in 16 games (nine starts), totaling 37 tackles (30 solo), four sacks, two forced fumbles, a fumble recovery, and a blocked punt.

2018 season
On March 12, 2018, the Broncos placed a second-round restricted free agent tender on Barrett. On April 23, 2018, he signed his exclusive rights tender. Barrett finished the season with 28 tackles, three sacks, and a pass defended in 13 games.

Tampa Bay Buccaneers

2019 season
On March 15, 2019, Barrett signed a one-year contract with the Tampa Bay Buccaneers.

During a Week 2 20-14 road victory over the Carolina Panthers, Barrett sacked Cam Newton thrice. With his strong performance, Barrett earned NFC Defensive Player of the Week honors. In the next game against the New York Giants, Barrett recorded a career-best four sacks and two forced fumbles, tying the franchise single-game sack record held by Simeon Rice and Marcus Jones, as well as becoming the first player in franchise history to record at least three sacks in back to back games. The Buccaneers narrowly lost 32–31. The following week, Barrett recorded his first NFL interception and a strip-sack on Jared Goff which was returned for a touchdown by teammate Ndamukong Suh in a 55–40 road victory over the Los Angeles Rams. As a result of his strong first month of play (nine sacks, an interception, three forced fumbles at the end of Week 4), Barrett was named the NFC Defensive Player of the Month for September.

During a Week 15 38–17 road victory over the Detroit Lions, Barrett recorded five tackles and a sack, tying the Buccaneers franchise record for sacks in a single season held by Warren Sapp. On December 17, 2019, Barrett was selected to the 2020 Pro Bowl, the first of his career. In the regular-season finale against the Atlanta Falcons, he sacked Matt Ryan thrice in the 28-22 overtime loss, breaking the Buccaneers franchise record set by Sapp for the most sacks in a single season with 19.5.

Barrett finished the 2019 season setting new career highs with a league leading 19.5 sacks, 58 tackles, six forced fumbles, two pass deflections, and an interception in 16 games and starts.

2020 season
On March 16, 2020, the Buccaneers placed the franchise tag on Barrett. He signed the one-year tender on July 15, 2020, worth around $15.8 million.

During a Week 3 28–10 road victory over his former team, the Denver Broncos, Barrett had six total tackles and two sacks which included his first career safety on quarterback Jeff Driskel. Barrett was named NFC Defensive Player of the Week for his performance. In Week 9 against the New Orleans Saints on Sunday Night Football, Barrett recorded four tackles and a strip-sack on Drew Brees that was recovered by the Buccaneers during the 38–3 loss. Three weeks later against the Kansas City Chiefs, Barrett recorded a strip-sack on Patrick Mahomes that was recovered by the Buccaneers in the 27–24 loss. In Week 14 against the Minnesota Vikings, Barrett recorded two sacks on Kirk Cousins and four tackles as the Buccaneers won 26–14.

Barrett was placed on the reserve/COVID-19 list by the Buccaneers on January 1, 2021, As a result, he missed the regular-season finale against the Atlanta Falcons and was activated on January 6.

Barrett finished the 2020 season with 57 total tackles, eight sacks, three passes defended, and two forced fumbles in 15 games and starts. He recorded five total tackles and sacked Aaron Rodgers thrice during the NFC Championship Game as the Buccaneers defeated the Green Bay Packers 31–26 to advance to Super Bowl LV. Tampa Bay defeated the Chiefs by a score of 31–9 in the Super Bowl, giving Barrett his second Super Bowl ring. During the game, Barrett recorded a tackle and sacked Patrick Mahomes once.

2021 season
On March 17, 2021, Barrett signed a four-year contract extension, worth $72 million ($36 million guaranteed) with the Buccaneers.

During the season-opening 31–29 victory over the Dallas Cowboys, Barrett recorded four tackles and sacked Dak Prescott once. In the next game against the Atlanta Falcons, Barrett recorded two tackles, a pass deflection, and an interception in the 48-25 victory. Two weeks later against the New England Patriots, Barrett recorded three tackles, a pass deflection, and a sack in the narrow 19-17 road victory. During a Week 5 45–17 victory over the Miami Dolphins, he recorded four tackles, 1.5 sacks, and a forced fumble. In the next game against the Philadelphia Eagles, Barrett recorded four tackles and a sack in a 28–22 road victory. The following week against the Chicago Bears, he recorded four tackles, a sack, a forced fumble, and a fumble recovery as the Buccaneers won by a score of 38-3. During a Week 12 38–31 road victory over the Indianapolis Colts, Barrett recorded eight tackles, two sacks, a forced fumble, and a fumble recovery. Two weeks later against the Buffalo Bills, he recorded three tackles and 1.5 sacks in the 33-27 overtime victory.

Barrett finished the regular season with 51 tackles, 10 sacks, four pass deflections, three forced fumbles, and two fumble recoveries in 15 games and starts. The Buccaneers finished atop the NFC South with a 13-4 record and qualified for the playoffs. In the Wild Card Round of the 2021–22 NFL playoffs, Barrett recorded an interception and a pass deflection in the 31-15 victory. In the Divisional Round against the Los Angeles Rams, Barrett recorded three tackles in the narrow 30–27 loss.

2022 season
During a Week 8 27-22 loss to the Baltimore Ravens, Barrett suffered a torn Achilles, prematurely ending his season. He finished the season with 31 tackles, three sacks, and a forced fumble in eight games and starts.

NFL career statistics

Regular season

Postseason

NFL records
 Most sacks through the first three weeks of a season: 8 (2019) (tied with Mark Gastineau)
 Most sacks through the first four weeks of a season: 9 (2019) (tied with Mark Gastineau, Kevin Greene, and Kabeer Gbaja-Biamila)

Buccaneers franchise records
 Most sacks in a season: 19.5 (2019)
 Most sacks in a game: 4 (tied) (September 22, 2019 vs New York Giants)
 Most forced fumbles in a game: 2 (tied) (September 22, 2019 vs New York Giants)

Personal life
Barrett attended Boys Town (Neb.) High School, where he was an all-state defensive lineman. Barrett was named Athlete of the Year at Boys Town.

Barrett married his wife, Jordanna, on February 2, 2012. They have three children. Barrett is a Christian.

References

External links
 Official website 
 Tampa Bay Buccaneers bio
 Colorado State Rams bio
 ESPN.com profile

1992 births
Living people
Players of American football from Baltimore
American football outside linebackers
Nebraska–Omaha Mavericks football players
Colorado State Rams football players
Denver Broncos players
Tampa Bay Buccaneers players
National Conference Pro Bowl players